Club foot or club feet is a congenital deformity.

Club foot  may also refer to:
The Clubfoot, painting by Jusepe de Ribera, now at the Louvre
Club Foot, music venue in Austin, Texas, USA
Club Foot (song), by Kasabian
Club Foot Orchestra, avant garde musical group
Club foot (furniture), a form of foot used in furniture design

See also
Klub Foot, London live music club